Ente Maathavu was an Indian Malayalam television series directed by Venu Chelakkottu. The show premiered on Surya TV and started streaming on Sun NXT on 27 January 2020. The show aired its last episode on 25 June 2022.

Plot
Angel, whose mother died after giving birth to her, prays to the Virgin Mary every day. Feeling alone and abandoned in the world, Angel seeks solace in prayer.  She comes to consider Mother Mary as a replacement for her deceased mother.

Cast
Lead Cast
Eileen Eliza as Angel and Jewel (Dual role)
Vishnu Prasad as Johnson (Angel's father, Main male lead)
M. R. Gopakumar as Father Idikula
Sreedevi Anil as Annie (Angel's stepmother)(Former Antagonist)
Binsa Mariam as Isa (Angel's stepsister)
 as Kevin (Angel and Isa's half brother, Johnson and Annie's son)
 Recurring Cast                         
Santhosh Sasidharan as CI Benjamin
Sajan Surya as Dr.Murali
Shelly Kishore as Jeena
Ajay Thomas as Solaman (Angel's 1st elder uncle)
Vijay Anand as Samuel
Neeraja Das as Nancy
Souparnika Subash as Mohita, Murali's wife
Arun G Raghavan as Roshan
Shalu Kurian as Sophy
Rishi as Lucifer(Antagonist)
___ as Kunjatta
Shobi Thilakan as Bhoominathan
Molly Kannamaly as Katrina
Kalabhavan Jinto as Luca(Angel's 2nd elder uncle,Former Antagonist)
Beena Antony as Nethravathi
Reshmi Soman as Aami
Renjusha Menon as Elsa(Former Antagonist)
Sini  Varghese as Tesa(Luca's wife, Angel's 2nd aunt)
Kulappulli Leela as Annie Ammachi
T.S.Raju as Bhaskaran
Valsala Menon as Valyamachi
Mallika Sukumaran as Molly
Shivaji Guruvayoor as Paulo
Maneesha K. Subrahmaniam as Rebecca
Nandakishor Nellical as Kapyar Chandy
Omana Ouseph as Sethulakshmi
Shobha Mohan as Alice 
Premi Viswanath as Devika
Jinza Sarah As Anna
Rajesh Paravoor as Civil Police Officer Anwar
Aleena Tresa George as Chithralekha(Antagonist)
_ as Rosemol
_ as Devi
 as Appu
 as Thamara
Sumesh Chandran as Isaa's father
Nimisha Bijo as Doctor
Gyandev as Jayaram
Guinness Pakru as himself
Manu Martin Pallippadan as Vikki
Kezia
Vyjayanthi as Sonia
Manjadi Joby as Esther
Arjun S Kalathingal as Sudeep
Tony as Sudeep's father
Ravikrishnan Gopalakrishnan as 
Stella Raja

Former Cast
Sarayu Mohan as Helan Valookkaran(Main female lead)
Ambika Mohan as Mother of Helan
Adithyan Jayan as Benny (Antagonist)(dead)
Naseer Sankranthi as Kapyar Pyli
Santhosh Keezhattoor as Devaraj(dead)
_ as Jessy(dead)
Ramesh Kottayam as Ambanadan Philippos (Angel's grandfather, dead)
Divya Yeshodharan as Sara (Angel's mother, dead)
Subbalakshmi as Valyammachi
Annmaria as Clara
Sarath Swamy as Aparichithan
Baby Kalyani 
Stephy Leon as Unknown lady (Cameo Appearance)
Vijayakumari as Ammachi

Title Song

References

2020 Indian television series debuts
Malayalam-language television shows
Surya TV original programming